Volodymyr Demchenko (born 16 April 1981) is a Ukrainian sprinter who competed in the 2004 Summer Olympics.

References

1981 births
Living people
Ukrainian male sprinters
Olympic athletes of Ukraine
Athletes (track and field) at the 2004 Summer Olympics
Universiade medalists in athletics (track and field)
Universiade gold medalists for Ukraine
Medalists at the 2003 Summer Universiade